Ellen Gould Zweibel (born 20 December 1952, New York City) is an American astrophysicist and plasma physicist.

In 1973, Zweibel received her bachelor's degree in mathematics from the University of Chicago and in 1977 her Ph.D. in physics from Princeton with thesis The Equilibrium and Radial Oscillations of Cool Stellar Disks under the supervision of Jeremiah P. Ostriker. She was a visiting scholar at the Institute for Advanced Study for the academic year 1977–1978 and then joined the solar physics group of the High Altitude Observatory of the National Center for Atmospheric Research. In addition, she was from 1980 to 2003 a professor at the University of Colorado. She is now the William L. Kraushaar Professor of Astronomy and Physics at the University of Wisconsin–Madison. Zweibel is a founding member and former director of the Center of Magnetic Self-Organization of the National Science Foundation (NSF) and of the Department of Energy (DOE).

Recognition
In 1991, she was elected a Fellow of the American Physical Society.

In 2016, she received the James Clerk Maxwell Prize for Plasma Physics for "seminal research on the energetics, stability, and dynamics of astrophysical plasmas, including those related to stars and galaxies, and for leadership in linking plasma and other astrophysical phenomena". She investigates astrophysical phenomena and plasmas physics of the sun, stars, galaxies, and clusters of galaxies.

She was elected to the National Academy of Sciences in 2021.

References

External links
Homepage, University of Wisconsin–Madison

University of Chicago alumni
Princeton University alumni
University of Colorado faculty
University of Wisconsin–Madison faculty
Fellows of the American Physical Society
Members of the United States National Academy of Sciences
1952 births
Living people
American astrophysicists
Women astrophysicists
American plasma physicists
20th-century American physicists
20th-century American women scientists
21st-century American physicists
21st-century American women scientists
American women academics